Hoërskool D.F. Malan is a public Afrikaans medium co-educational high school situated in the suburb of Boston, Bellville in the Western Cape province of South Africa - near Cape Town. It was named after D.F Malan, the prime minister of South Africa from 1948 to 1954. In 2012 and 2013, the school was included in The Cambridge University Student Guide to Excellence, a selection of 100 top schools worldwide. In recent years, it has been one of the academically top-performing schools in the Western Cape.

History

The school was established in 1951. D Brink was the first principal up to 1969. He was followed by: E Smit 1970–1977, H Franzen 1978–1986, C de Jager 1986–1988, B Volschenk 1989–1996, R Truter 1996–2007, Joe Dorfling 2007-2016 and currently Sias Conradie.

Music scene

DF Malan is also notable for producing several famous musicians on the local South African music scene, such as Pierre Greeff and Hunter Kennedy. Consequently, many local bands including aKing, Foto na Dans, Jax Panik, Lukraaketaar, Die Heuwels Fantasties and Frik13 are associated with the school. This, along with the fact that other similar musicians attended neighbour school Bellville, has led to the Bellville area, in which these schools are situated, earning the nickname "Bellville Rock City". Also on the music scene DF Malan produced musician Loki Rothman, who reached the final of SA's Got Talent in 2009 (while still a senior in the school), and the founding members of Cape Town alt-pop duo EMERGER: Emma de Goede and Gerrit "Gerry" Matthee. Their debut single "Break & Fall" was a winner of the international Avid and Abbey Road Studios Song Contest and they were featured as Apple Music's New Artist Spotlight in July 2018.

Alumni

Other notable alumni include former Springbok rugby player Werner Greeff, international cricket umpire Marais Erasmus, ballet dancer Eduard Greyling and a former dean of Engineering at the University of Stellenbosch, Prof Arnold Schoonwinkel. Actors Leigh Wakeford, Albert Maritz and 7de Laan duo Chris Vorster and Corné Crous all attended DF Malan.

Sister School

DF Malan has a sister-school in Kortrijk, Belgium and some of the students from these schools usually visit each other yearly.

Athletics

DF Malan High School annually participates in the MTBS athletics competition, along with three other schools from the Bellville area: Bellville, Tygerberg and Stellenberg. MTBS is especially well known for the performance of these schools' non-participating pupils on the pavilion as they perform songs and cheers to encourage their athletes during the day - for which a trophy is also awarded. DF Malan has thus far been the second most successful school in the singing trophy - winning it two time less than Stellenberg. It is in the athletics, however, where the school achieved unprecedented success - winning the trophy all but three times in the first 19-years of the competition.

Other events

The school also participates in a yearly Interschools event (week-long derby) with its local rival Bellville High School, in which the schools contest on most platforms - including Rugby , Field hockey, Netball, Cross country, Chess, Debate, Mountain biking and, from 2013 onwards, EA Sports FIFA. The first team rugby, hockey and netball matches are the main events. In recent years Bellville has strongly dominated the rugby, DF Malan Hoërskool strongly dominating both Boys' and Girls' hockey (although Bellville won the 2012 girls hockey match). The netball is usually an unpredictable affair.

References

External links
Official website

Schools in Cape Town
Schools in the Western Cape
High schools in South Africa